The Production Company was an Australian not-for-profit theatre company that staged a series of usually three musicals at the Arts Centre Melbourne each year, until its closure in 2020.

It was launched in 1999 by Jeanne Pratt AC with the goal of providing "professional opportunities for local artists and to entertain Melbourne audiences with the best shows from Broadway and beyond".

The Production Company specialised in revivals of popular and lesser known musicals with short (two week) rehearsal periods and short runs. It also produced the Australian professional premieres of Thoroughly Modern Millie, Dirty Rotten Scoundrels, Grey Gardens, Nice Work If You Can Get It, Curtains and A Gentleman's Guide to Love and Murder.

Its productions typically featured well-known Australian musical theatre performers such as Caroline O'Connor (Gypsy, Funny Girl), Michael Falzon (Chess), Marina Prior (Guys and Dolls, Kiss Me, Kate), Todd McKenney (The Boy from Oz, La Cage aux Folles), Lucy Durack (Kiss Me, Kate, Thoroughly Modern Millie), Christie Whelan Browne (The Producers, Sugar), Elise McCann (Brigadoon, Oklahoma) and Amanda Harrison (Anything Goes, Oklahoma!).

Seasons
The list of early productions can be found on the AusStage  database

1990s
1999
 She Loves Me
 Mame
 Funny Girl

2000s
2000
 Guys and Dolls
 The Gilbert & Sullivan Show
 Gypsy
 Call Me Madam

2001
 Anything Goes
 Mack and Mabel
 How to Succeed in Business Without Really Trying

2002
 Hello, Dolly!
 The Music Man
 Hair - The American Tribal Love-Rock Musical

2003
 They're Playing Our Song
 South Pacific
 Bye Bye Birdie
 Hair (Sydney season and Melbourne return season)

2004
 Annie Get Your Gun
 Carousel
 High Society

2005
 Oklahoma!
 Sunset Boulevard
 Kiss Me, Kate
 South Pacific (Adelaide season)

2006
 Thoroughly Modern Millie
 Camelot
 The Pajama Game

2007
 Sweet Charity 
 Little Me 
 42nd Street

2008
 Follies (State Theatre, 16–20 July) 
 Damn Yankees 
 Mame

2009
 Crazy for You (State Theatre, 15–19 July) 
 Dirty Rotten Scoundrels (State Theatre, 30 September – 4 October) 
 The Boyfriend (State Theatre, 12–16 August)

2010s
2010
 The King & I (State Theatre, 14–25 July)  
 The Boy From Oz (State Theatre, 18–22 August) 
 Sugar (State Theatre, 29 September - 3 October)

2011
 The Boy From Oz (State Theatre, 5–16 January; 9–13 February) 
 Anything Goes (State Theatre, 20–24 July) 
 Kismet (State Theatre, 17–21 August) 
 Grey Gardens (Playhouse, 24 November–4 December)

2012
 The Producers (State Theatre, 10–15 July)
 Chess (State Theatre, 21–26 August)
 Promises, Promises (State Theatre, 3–7 October)

2013
 Gypsy (State Theatre, 6–14 July)
 Singin’ in the Rain (State Theatre, 21–25 August)
 The Pirates of Penzance (Hamer Hall, 30 October – 3 November)

2014
 Guys And Dolls (State Theatre, 19–27 July)
 Show Boat (State Theatre, 16–24 August)
 La Cage aux Folles (Playhouse, 21 November – 7 December)

2015
 West Side Story (State Theatre)
 Nice Work If You Can Get It (State Theatre)
 Jerry's Girls (Playhouse)

2016
 Funny Girl (State Theatre)
 Curtains (State Theatre)
 Dusty (Playhouse)

2017
 Hello, Dolly! (Playhouse)
 Jesus Christ Superstar (State Theatre)
 Brigadoon (State Theatre)

2018
Oklahoma! (State Theatre)
The Boy from Oz (State Theatre)
A Gentleman's Guide to Love and Murder (Playhouse, Australian premiere)

2019
Lazarus (Playhouse, Australian premiere)
Thoroughly Modern Millie (State Theatre)
Ragtime (State Theatre, Australian premiere)

Awards

Helpmann Awards
The Production Company's production of Grey Gardens was nominated for the 2012 Helpmann Award for Best Musical. Performers and creatives who have won Helpmann Awards for their work with The Production Company include Pamela Rabe and Nancye Hayes for Grey Gardens (for Best Female Actor in a Musical and Best Female Actor in a Supporting Role in a Musical, respectively), and David Campbell for Sunset Boulevard (for Best Male Actor in a Musical).

Green Room Awards
The Production Company's production of Chess received the 2012 Melbourne Green Room Award for Outstanding Musical Production (as well as seven other awards).

References

External links
 Official Website

Theatre companies in Australia
Musical theatre companies
Theatre in Melbourne